Parakneria is a genus of fish in the family Kneriidae, with 14 species, all of which are restricted to Africa.

Species 
There are 14 species:

 Parakneria abbreviata (Pellegrin, 1931)
 Parakneria cameronensis (Boulenger, 1909)
 Parakneria damasi Poll, 1965
 Parakneria fortuita M. J. Penrith, 1973 (Cubango kneria)
 Parakneria kissi Poll, 1969
 Parakneria ladigesi Poll, 1967
 Parakneria lufirae Poll, 1965
 Parakneria malaissei Poll, 1969
 Parakneria marmorata (Norman, 1923)
 Parakneria mossambica R. A. Jubb & Bell-Cross, 1974 (Gorongoza kneria)
 Parakneria spekii (Günther, 1868)
 Parakneria tanzaniae Poll, 1984
 Parakneria thysi Poll, 1965
 Parakneria vilhenae Poll, 1965

References

 
Kneriidae
Fish of Africa
Freshwater fish genera
Taxa named by Max Poll
Taxonomy articles created by Polbot